Garfield Township is one of twenty-four townships in Antelope County, Nebraska, United States. The population was 498 at the 2010 census.

The village of Orchard lies within the township.

See also
County government in Nebraska

References

External links
City-Data.com

Townships in Antelope County, Nebraska
Townships in Nebraska